Hallaj Mahalleh (also Romanized as Ḩallāj Maḩalleh) is a village in Gurab Pas Rural District, in the Central District of Fuman County, Gilan Province, Iran. At the 2006 census, its population was 120, in 31 families.

References 

Populated places in Fuman County